A procession is an organized body of people advancing in a formal or ceremonial manner.

Procession may also refer to:

 Procession (album), a 1983 album by Weather Report
 Procession (band), an Australian pop/jazz  band
 "Procession" (The Moody Blues song), 1971
 "Procession" (New Order song), 1981
 Procession (sculpture), a 1982 sculpture and mural in Eugene, Oregon, US
Procession (film), a 2021 documentary directed by Robert Greene

See also 
 Procession of the Holy Spirit, in Christianity, theological notion regarding the origin of the Holy Spirit
 Processional (disambiguation)
 Protest (disambiguation)